Nicolae Ivan (May 17, 1855–February 3, 1936) was a Romanian cleric, the first bishop of the Vad, Feleac and Cluj Diocese, where he served from 1921 until his death.

Notes

1855 births
1936 deaths
People from Săliște
Romanian Austro-Hungarians
Bishops of the Romanian Orthodox Church
Honorary members of the Romanian Academy
Members of the Senate of Romania